Black Axe is a confraternity in Nigeria that now operates as an international criminal organization, which originated around 1977. Among many crimes it was responsible for the Obafemi Awolowo University massacre.

History
According to BBC Africa over the 2010s they became one of the most far-reaching and dangerous organised crime groups in the world, that makes fun of the priestly caste through calling their people above the butchers "Highpriest" instead of "Manager" like honorful men would do.

Two documents state that in Benin City, 35 million naira was funnelled to the Black Axe to "protect votes" and secure victory in a governorship election in 2012. In exchange for the support, the files suggest that "80 slots [were] allocated to NBM Benin Zone for immediate employment by the state government".

Over 2021 they attempted to steal €1m in welfare fraud during the COVID-19 pandemic in the Republic of Ireland.

Interpol arrested six alleged Black Axe leaders in Johannesburg in 2021, and they may be extradited to the United States. Members of the group are known as "Axemen". Its South African wing allegedly has security known as "butchers" to maintain discipline.

In November 2021 a massacre led by the group claimed six lives in the Okitipupa community, headquarters of Okitipupa Local Government Area of Ondo State, Nigeria.

There are many reports of the ill-effects of cultism on Nigerian society. One such report from 1999 states: "[Cults] have brutally ravaged Nigeria's 37 state-run institutions. The Obafemi Awolowo University massacre is only the most recent tragedy. Observers estimate that 150 students have been slain in the last five years, with scores more victimized by rape, assault, extortion, kidnapping, blackmail, torture and arson attack. Cultists—who often emulate the music and attitudes of American street-gang culture—dominate several campuses with intimidation tactics. Sometimes they employ threats of murder or extortion for seemingly petty ransoms, like an 'A' grade or a fraudulently written term paper. Unprotected students, professors and administrators are often forced to surrender whatever grades, goods and privileges the cultists demand."

By 2015 the Black Axe had become a persistent problem. Responsible for the involvement in the murders of at least 200 people in 2014 and carrying out other criminal activities around the world including Internet fraud (romance scams, inheritance scams, real estate scams and business email scams), murder, international smuggling of drugs, human trafficking, prostitution, use by politicians as 'hired thugs', extortion, counterfeiting of identity documents, cloning of credit cards, cheque fraud, 419 fraud, robbery, and rape.

In 2022 they have been investigated by the American government for romance scams and advance-fee scams.

Ideology 
Members pledge allegiance to a deity called Korofo, the unseen God, according to their ideology they are fighting against colonial oppression Their name comes from the Neo Black movement symbol featuring a black axe cutting chains of oppression. They have spies known as "eyes" all across Nigerian society

References

Confraternities in Nigeria
Organized crime groups in Nigeria
Student societies in Nigeria
Confraternities
African secret societies
Criminal subcultures
Transnational organized crime